Lindsay Raymond "Ray" Jackson (born 12 December 1948, Wallsend, Northumberland) is an English mandolin and harmonica player. He was a member and also joint lead vocalist, with Alan Hull, of the folk-rock group Lindisfarne from their original formation in 1970 until his departure in 1990. The group's drummer Ray Laidlaw shared the same forename, and thus Jackson was generally known in the group as "Jacka".

After leaving school he studied graphics at Newcastle College of Art and Industrial Design, where he met Laidlaw.

With Lindisfarne 
He designed the group's logo and the sleeve of their debut album Nicely Out of Tune. Alongside his activities in Lindisfarne, he also played mandolin on Rod Stewart's solo albums Every Picture Tells a Story (1971), Never a Dull Moment (1972), and Smiler (1974). His playing can be heard particularly on the songs "Maggie May", "Mandolin Wind" and "Farewell". He was not credited by name on the sleeve of Every Picture Tells a Story, only by a reference: "The mandolin was played by the mandolin player in Lindisfarne. The name slips my mind."

Jackson threatened legal action against Stewart in 2003, claiming that he should have been credited as co-composer of "Maggie May" alongside Stewart and guitarist Martin Quittenton for writing the musical "hook" of the song. Stewart had called Jackson in to play on "Mandolin Wind", and was so pleased at the results that he asked the musician if he had any ideas for the unfinished "Maggie May". Jackson claimed that he wrote the famous and instantly recognizable mandolin hook. In a statement he said, "I am convinced that my contribution to 'Maggie May,' which occurred in the early stages of my career when I was just becoming famous for my work with Lindisfarne, was essential to the success of the record. Furthermore, a writing credit would have given me a writing status which would have encouraged my writing efforts and could well have opened doors for me." His manager Barry McKay said that Jackson was asked to write something in the studio for the then unfinished record and wrote the hook. At the time, he had no idea he would be entitled to part-ownership as joint composer, and was merely paid a £15 session fee. A spokesman for Stewart dismissed his claim as "ridiculous".

In Lindisfarne, Jackson generally took lead vocals on the songs written by bassist and fiddle player Rod Clements, including "Meet Me on the Corner", their first hit single. He stayed with the group in 1973 when three of the five original members left to form Jack the Lad. He designed the sleeve for Jack the Lad's third album Rough Diamonds, and played harmonica on the record. He also played mandolin on Chris de Burgh's debut album Far Beyond These Castle Walls.

Branching out 
When Lindisfarne disbanded in 1975, Jackson embarked on a solo career with EMI. The contract, signed in October 1975, included a clause that the company would release three singles within the first year. Only one, "Take Some Time", was issued; it sold around 300 copies and no further releases were forthcoming. Jackson and McKay later sued EMI for ruining his solo career, on the grounds that they had failed to promote the record properly or record the promised three singles. EMI's defence was based on their belief that musical material provided by Jackson "was not satisfactory and would have been a commercial failure". The case came to court in March 1985; the judge ruled that according to the contract, Jackson was not obliged to provide his own material. Jackson and McKay were awarded damages and costs against the company to a total of £23,304.

Also in 1975, he formed Harcourt's Heroes with singer-guitarist Charlie Harcourt, with whom he had formed a songwriting partnership while both were members of Lindisfarne between 1973 and 1975. However, the original Lindisfarne line-up reunited for sell-out Christmas concerts at Newcastle City Hall in 1976 and repeated this in 1977. In early 1978 they decided to get back together for good, and by that summer their first single "Run For Home" was not only a Top 10 hit in the UK but also gave them their long-awaited breakthrough into the US Top 40, reaching No. 33. The album it was taken from, Back and Fourth, also reached the UK top 25. Apart from the earlier group credited 'B' side "Scotch Mist", Back and Fourth saw Jackson receive his first writing credits for two songs written with Charlie Harcourt, "Warm Feeling" and "King's Cross Blues". The following album "The News", featured their composition "This Has Got To End" while their song "Winning The Game" was featured on "Sleepless Nights".

Jackson also recorded a solo album, In The Night, released in 1980, produced by Hugh Murphy, which included material co-written by him and Harcourt, as well as songs such as "In the Midnight Hour", "Little Town Flirt", and the Stealers Wheel hit "Everything Will Turn Out Fine". "Hugh Murphy and I were asked to compromise and record a number of new songs from other sources to make it sound more commercial to the emerging market, leaving out some of the self-penned songs", he said. "Regardless of this, I had a great time making the album and some great musicians played on it with me. Today, I feel that some of the performances and the songs are old-fashioned sounding. However, there are still a few which stand the test of time quite well."

Later years 
By the mid-1980s, Lindisfarne were no longer enjoying the success of former years. After a disagreement between Jackson and the band around the time Lindisfarne recorded a re-worked version of "Fog on the Tyne" with Paul Gascoigne—in which Jackson took part neither in the recording or in the promotional video—the musician retired from performing and joined a sports marketing agency as promotional manager, working on sports sponsorships. Jackson did not appear with Lindisfarne again for 15 years, until he appeared onstage to rapturous applause at a memorial concert at Newcastle City Hall at a memorial concert in November 2005, organised to celebrate the life and music of Alan Hull.

Later, he decided to resume his creative and artistic interests by opening an art studio and picture framing business at Witney, Oxfordshire. He is particularly known for his skilled paintings of period buses in their correct street settings with perfect detail.

In recent years Jackson formed the band Gathering – Legends of Folk Rock with Jerry Donahue, Clive Bunker, Rick Kemp, Doug Morter and Kristina Donahue.

In February 2013, in support of Newcastle City Hall which was then under threat of closure, Ray Jackson announced he would return to the famous venue for a Christmas show for the first time in 23 years. Tickets for Ray Jackson's Lindisfarne Christmas Show sold out in six hours. Second and third shows were added for 20/22 December 2013 which also sold out. Jackson announced the permanent return of Lindisfarne after 10 years. Ray Jackson's Lindisfarne is his third career line-up. The band is composed of five former members of Lindisfarne, plus Roxy Music drummer Paul Thompson.

On 12 January 2015, the 'Lindisfarne Official' Facebook page posted the following announcement: "It is with regret that we have to announce Ray Jackson's retirement from Lindisfarne. Although his decision has come as a surprise to us, it was always Jacka's intention to hand things over at some point and ensure the great name of Lindisfarne continues to keep the songs and spirit alive well into the future. The band intend to honour all diary commitments through 2015 and will be announcing more details very soon."

References

1948 births
Living people
English songwriters
English male singers
People from Wallsend
Musicians from Tyne and Wear
British mandolinists
British harmonica players
British folk rock musicians
British painters
British male painters
People from Oxfordshire
Lindisfarne (band) members
British male songwriters